The 2010–11 season was the 54th season in RK Zamet’s history. It is their 3rd successive season in the Dukat Premier League, and 34th successive top tier season.

First team squad

Goalkeeper
 1  Marin Đurica
 12  Ivan Stevanović
 16  Dino Slavić
 40  Luka Sorić

Wingers
RW
 6  Dario Černeka
 15  Igor Montanari - Knez
LW
 2  Damir Vučko 
 4  Mateo Hrvatin

Line players
 3  Marin Zubčić
 7  Milan Uzelac (captain)
 10  Krešimir Kozina

Back players
LB
 5  Luka Tandara
 8  Bojan Lončarić
 17  Patrick Čuturić
CB
 9  Bruno Kozina
 18  Matija Golik
 19  Marin Sakić
RB
 11  Marin Kružić
 13  Luka Kovačević
 20  Luka Bracanović

Source: rukometstat.com

Technical staff
  President: Zlatko Kolić
  Vice-president: Željko Jovanović 
  Sports director: Aleksandar Čupić 
  Head Coach: Alen Kurbanović 
  Assistant Coach: Marin Mišković
  Goalkeeper Coach: Igor Dokmanović
  Fitness Coach: Branimir Maričević
  Tehniko: Williams Černeka

Competitions

Overall

Dukat Premier League

League table

Source: SportNet.hr

Matches

Croatian Cup

PGŽ Cup - Qualifiers

Matches

Friendlies

Sources
HRS
Sport.net.hr

References

RK Zamet seasons
Handball in Croatia